Hara (character common to Chinese and : abdomen, should not be translated as "stomach" to avoid confusing it with the organ). In the Japanese medical tradition and in Japanese martial arts traditions, the word Hara is used as a technical term for a specific area (physical/anatomical) or energy field (physiological/energetic) of the body. An alternative Japanese reading of the character is Hufu, the Chinese reading is Fu.

In the Japanese medical tradition 
In the medical tradition of Japan, hara refers to the soft belly, i.e. the area defined vertically by the lower edge of the sternum and the upper edge of the pubis and laterally by the lower border of the ribcage and the anterior iliac crest respectively.  It corresponds with that area of the peritoneum, which is not obscured by the ribcage, and thus more or less coincides with the viscera covered by the greater omentum.

Diagnosis 

Similar to western medical practitioners, Japanese physicians and medical therapists use the abdomen (hara) in diagnosis to determine the health or otherwise of the patient, particularly, but not exclusively, the state of the abdominal organs or tissues and the related energy fields. 
While in western medicine the palpation of the abdomen (abdominal examination) is aimed at the physical organs palpable in that area to assess their size, shape, consistency, reaction to pressure and such, in eastern medicine the Hara is seen as an area that reflects the state of all the organs (physically palpable in the abdomen or not), their energetic as well as their physical state, and their complex functional relationships with each other. In diagnosis and treatment, the Hara is partitioned in areas, each of which is considered – on the basis of empirical evidence – to represent one of the (ten, eleven or twelve) vital organs AND their functional energy fields. The details of this basic model of Hara diagnosis may differ from school to school, depending on which underlying philosophical, physiological, pathological or therapeutic model of Japanese or Chinese medicine is being used (e.g. Five Elements, Five Phases, Yin and Yang, Zang Fu or Meridian theory), but the underlying principles remain the same.

Diagnosis in the context of the far-eastern medical traditions 

In the Chinese medical tradition, especially in modern herbalism and acupuncture, the palpation of the pulses (three on each wrist, see pulse diagnosis) is used as the major method for palpation diagnosis. While in China, or some parts of Chinese society, pulse diagnosis may have been culturally more acceptable for being less intimate or invasive than Hara diagnosis or whole body palpation, it has also been claimed that the cause for its increasing use may have to do with the prevalence of certain traditions or schools of Chinese medical theory – in the past as well as in the country's recent history.

To put this into context it is worth considering that, in the West, we have, of course, always depended not only on the (more or less accurate) transcription and translation of existing source material, but also on what has been made available for translation, i.e. what has been made accessible for Westerners via teaching and training, opening of archives and libraries, and more recently via modern editions. It is therefore, if not surprising so in any case educating to observe, that French practice and research in the field of far-eastern or oriental (as some prefer to call it) medicine has often relied on Vietnamese teachings, sources and literature (note that in colonial times, Vietnam was part of French Indochina), while earlier German and English practitioners and researchers seem to have drawn on pre-modern Chinese sources (note that European powers were influential in China during the Qing dynasty(1644–1911). American practitioners and scholars in the field, on the other hand, seem to have benefited initially from post-war Japanese material, which became available after the country had fallen under American administration in 1945 (History of Japan) but, after the opening of China in the seventies, began to source their materials there. It is fair to say, that in present days most new source materials and commentaries used by researchers, and consequently teachers, students and practitioners, are those being printed and published by research institutes of the People's Republic of China.

The Japanese medical tradition on the other hand, which has always had strong leanings towards massage, has shown great continuity in its preference for the use of diagnostic palpation in a much more general way than the Chinese tradition as we know it. As a result, over the centuries the diagnostic art of the palpation of the whole body and more specifically of acu points, meridians and the abdomen or Hara was developed in Japan to a high standard.
As mentioned above, within this tradition, variations on the theme can be found as different schools base the development of their clinical work and theoretical models on different aspects of the philosophical and medical foundations they are building on. The contemporary Meridian Therapy School of Japanese Acupuncture for example, in which amongst others Shudo Denmei (1932– ) is a leading figure, places much importance on a wide range of palpatory skills in diagnosis and treatment. Their medical approach is based on the Five Phases model, with a strong emphasis on abdominal palpation, i.e. Hara diagnosis. It is used by acupuncturists as well as massage and Shiatsu therapists.

In Eastern and Western body-mind therapies

Apart from acupuncture, which is best known in the West, a number of other Eastern therapies explicitly focus on the Hara in their work, amongst them Anma, Ampuku, Shiatsu and QiGong. However, an ever growing number of body-mind therapies are being introduced to or developed in the West, which seem to be influenced by concepts directly or indirectly derived from or related to Eastern models of abdominal diagnosis and therapy, some using breathing techniques (Buteyko, Yoga), postural alignment and movement education like Postural Integration, Feldenkrais, Alexander Technique, Qigong and Yoga, or manual manipulation like Osteopathy, Shiatsu and massage. All aiming, it can be said, to relax, strengthen and support in their function the internal organs and tissues in, above and below the peritoneal cavity – in other words: the abdomen or Hara, with a view on holistic healing. In Osteopathy for example, an important part of abdominal work is the stimulation of venous circulation and the drainage of lymph, another the re-alignment of the organs.

In the martial arts 

It may be helpful to point out, to start with, that many problems in understanding concepts integral to East Asian culture have arisen simply due to divergent use of transcription, uncertain pronunciation and out-of-context translation, starting within the wider Asian community (Chinese into Japanese e.g.), and from there spreading by different pathways to the West. 

In martial arts, the Hara or Dantian is sometimes considered as equivalent to the lower of the three dantian (tanden in Japanese1). Various styles of martial arts describe this as being just below or directly behind the umbilicus. 
In Traditional Chinese Medicine (TCM) the by-name Dantian is given alternatively to three acupuncture points: the "Gate of Origin" (Ren 4), and the "Sea of Qi" (Ren 6), and, by some, also to the "Stone Gate" (Ren 5). All three points are situated on the midline (centre of the linea alba) of the lower abdomen (i.e. below the navel). They constitute part of the Ren Mai, usually translated as Conception Vessel (CV), which is one of the Qi Jing Ba Mai, the Eight Extraordinary Vessels or eminent energy pathways of the body.

Dantian is often translated as "elixir field", indicating that the needling points called "Sea of Qi", "Gate of Origin" and "Stone Gate" are not really sitting on the Ren Mai like dots on a line. Rather they represent a place from which the "Sea of Qi" etc. can be reached and influenced – either via the energy flow along the Ren Mai (Conception Vessel) or by penetrating deeper into the abdomen (the level to be determined by the length of the needle and the depth of its insertion, in the case of palpation, by the depth of penetration and Qi projection, in the case of breathing or movement exercises by the use of muscle tonus and combination, direction of connective tissue engagement etc.). Hence, as the point names indicate, the lower Dantian, which ever point it is associated with, ought to be seen as a three dimensional area of varying size inside the abdomen, not as a point on the abdomen. In that sense it is identical with the "small hara" or the "small abdomen", terms used in some Chinese classical texts and commentaries that discuss the origin and location of the Qi Jing Ba Mai (Eight Extraordinary Vessels) to which the Ren Mai belongs and is connected. Modern commentators believe that the terms refer to "the kidney reflex area below the umbilicus".

The Hara or lower Dantian, as conceptualised by the Chinese and Japanese martial arts, is important for their practice, because it is seen, as the term "Sea of Qi" indicates, as the reservoir of vital or source energy (Yuan Qi). It is, in other words, the vital centre of the body as well as the centre of gravity. For many martial arts, the extension of energy or force from this centre is a common concept. Many martial art styles, amongst them Aikido, emphasise the importance of "moving from the hara", i.e. moving from the centre of one's very being – body and mind. There are a large number of breathing exercises in traditional Japanese and Chinese martial arts where attention is always kept on the dantian or hara to strengthen the "Sea of Qi".

Martial arts and the Eastern medical tradition 

It seems that in the West eastern martial arts have, for a long time, been taught without much reference to the knowledge pertaining to the field of the healing arts, whereas in the East there was traditionally a strong interface between both practices – not least for the purpose of sustaining physical strength and healing injury. As mentioned above, language barriers, uncertainty of oral tradition and lack of in-depth training and proper source material as well as the vast variety of schools can easily lead to terminological imprecision, misinterpretation and misunderstanding. An example at hand is the question of the Hara: what and where is the Hara or Dantian (tanden); why is it so important in both traditions; and how is it related to the Eight Extraordinary Vessels and the other energy pathways (meridians or channels).

A closer look at the discourse on location and function of the Extraordinary Vessels reveals that not only the Ren Mai (Conception Vessel) is involved with the function of the Hara or Dantian, but that the Chong Mai (Penetrating Vessel, the Du Mai (Governing Vessel) and the Dai Mai (Girdle Vessel) also play a part in defining the What and Wherewithal of the "Sea of Qi", as all of them take part in one way or another in strengthening the lower Dantian and maintaining its connection and interaction with those energy fields of the body expressed in the form of meridians and organs.

To see why this would be so and why there is such a wide scope of interpretation, it helps to have a look at the discourse arising from the varying description of the starting points and passageways of those vessels in the body, and the variation in terminology used in the respective sources. The pitfalls of translation, interpretation and association we have already seen for the case of the "Dantien" can also be found for the acu-point "QiChong"  on the stomach meridian (ST30). In the classical literature of Chinese Medicine ST30 is widely said to be the starting point of the Chong Mai (Penetrating Vessel). The trouble is that ST30 is also known by the name of "QiJie'". The author Ling Shu for example writes in his commentary: "To explain about qijie: in the chest the qi has a jie, in the abdomen the qi has a jie, in the head the qi has a jie...". It has been suggested, that Ling Shu means to say that "QiJie" is "a meeting place of qi". This makes sense seeing that the character "GuanJié" – built from Guan (gate) and Jié (knot, tie, weave) – means "joint" (anatomical), but also "crucial link", "crucial point" or "crucial phase".  Hence the starting point (or place) of the Chong Mai (Penetrating Vessel) could be seen as identical with the lower Dantian – as suggested by the diagrams in the Manual of Acupuncture.

While martial arts teaching benefits from a deeper insight into the knowledge gathered in the traditions of Chinese and Japanese medicine, an ever stronger case is made for students and practitioners of the healing therapies based on those traditions to engage in practices such as Qigong, TaiJi or Aikido to enhance Qi cultivation, perception and projection. Certainly from a classical Eastern point of view, knowledge and regular practice of those disciplines would have been (and is) seen as an essential part of self-development aimed at strengthening the practitioner's own health as well as their understanding of the nature and flow of Qi. Without such personal and refined experience, it is considered difficult to foster and improve the skill of palpation at a level that allows the practitioner to determine the quality of Qi in his or her patient and influence it accordingly. Likewise the recommendation for patients is (and has been) to engage in Qi enhancing exercise to regain and maintain health.

References

Abdomen
Japanese martial arts terminology
Traditional Japanese medicine